Vicente Iborra de la Fuente (born 16 January 1988) is a Spanish professional footballer who plays as a defensive midfielder for Levante, on loan from Villarreal.

He played 297 games in La Liga over 12 seasons, scoring a total of 33 goals for Levante, Sevilla and Villarreal, winning the Europa League three times with the second club and once with the third. He also spent two years in the English Premier League with Leicester City, having signed in July 2017.

Club career

Levante
Born in Moncada, Valencian Community, Iborra was a product of Levante UD's youth system. He made his first-team debut during the 2007–08 season, as the club's severe financial problems prompted the exit of several players. After appearing in a Copa del Rey match against Getafe CF on 9 January 2008, he played in La Liga against Real Madrid four days later (0–2 home loss).

On 30 March 2008, Iborra scored his first Levante goal, a last-minute effort in a 2–1 defeat at UD Almería. In the 2009–10 campaign, as the side returned to the top flight after a two-year absence, he was one of the team's most used players — 36 games, 2,640 minutes — scoring once.

Sevilla
Iborra joined fellow league club Sevilla FC on 16 August 2013, after agreeing to a five-year contract. He finished his debut season with 41 matches and four goals in all competitions, including 12/1 in the UEFA Europa League which his side won.

In 2014–15, Iborra was often deployed in a more attacking midfield role by manager Unai Emery, and responded by scoring nine goals overall. On 24 September 2016 he filled in as the goalkeeper for the final two minutes away to Athletic Bilbao when Salvatore Sirigu was sent off, conceding a penalty from Aritz Aduriz in a 3–1 loss.

Sunderland agreed to pay Sevilla £7 million for Iborra, but called it off on 30 August 2016 as the summer transfer window came to a close. Under new coach Jorge Sampaoli he started the new season as a reserve. On 11 December, after replacing the injured Nicolás Pareja at half-time of the away fixture against RC Celta de Vigo, he scored a hat-trick which included a late penalty in a 3–0 win.

Leicester City
On 6 July 2017, Leicester City announced they had signed Iborra on a four-year contract for £15 million. After picking up a groin injury during pre-season, he did not make his debut until 19 September, when he played the whole of a 2–0 home win over Liverpool in the EFL Cup and provided the assist for Shinji Okazaki's goal. His first Premier League appearance was on 30 September as he played the second half of a 0–0 draw away to AFC Bournemouth, and he scored his first goal in the latter competition on 4 November in a 2–2 draw at Stoke City.

Villarreal
On 7 January 2019, Iborra joined Villarreal CF on a four-and-a-half-year deal for a reported fee of £9 million; he cited the failure of his family to adjust to life in England as the main reason for his departure. He appeared in 34 games in his first full season for the fifth-placed club, scoring in a 2–1 away loss against Real Madrid.

Iborra ruptured his left anterior cruciate ligament against Real Betis on 13 December 2020, and was sidelined for the rest of the campaign. He returned to Levante in July 2022, in a season-long loan.

Career statistics

Honours
Sevilla
UEFA Europa League: 2013–14, 2014–15, 2015–16
Copa del Rey runner-up: 2015–16
UEFA Super Cup runner-up: 2014, 2015, 2016

Villarreal
UEFA Europa League: 2020–21
UEFA Super Cup runner-up: 2021

References

External links

1988 births
Living people
People from Horta Nord
Sportspeople from the Province of Valencia
Spanish footballers
Footballers from the Valencian Community
Association football midfielders
La Liga players
Segunda División players
Segunda División B players
Atlético Levante UD players
Levante UD footballers
Sevilla FC players
Villarreal CF players
Premier League players
Leicester City F.C. players
UEFA Europa League winning players
Spanish expatriate footballers
Expatriate footballers in England
Spanish expatriate sportspeople in England